Vusanje is a village in Gusinje Municipality, Montenegro. According to the 2003 census, the town had 648 inhabitants.

Geography
Vusanje is located within the Plav municipality, below the town of Gusinje. It is located in the geographical region of Prokletije mountain, in the basin of the Lim river. There is a notable waterfall Grlja.

History
The village was settled by ancestors of the Kelmendi region of Albania, by Gjonbalaj and Nik Bala family.  Until 1912, it was part of Ottoman Empire. During the First Balkan War in 1912 it became part of the Kingdom of Montenegro. The village is made up of two settlements, Katundi i siper (upper village) and katundi i ulet (lower village).  Also there is a hamlet called Zarunic. Post 1913, the village was subjected to repression and discrimination from the Montenegrin and Yugoslavian governments. The result was the expulsion of the 90% of the population to the United States, mostly in the New York area. The remaining population is now 100% Albanian. 

There is an old cemetery in the village, called "the Catholic cemetery".

Culture
There are two mosques in the village (1990).

Anthropology
The village is Albanian-inhabited, one of three Kelmendi settlements along with Martinaj Martinovići and Nokshiq Novšići, in the Upper Polimlje region (1958). The majority of families hail from the nearby village Vukël in Kelmend across the border in Albania. The Albanians are native inhabitants in this region.

Families
Ulaj and Uljević
Gjonbalaj and Đonbalić
Ahmetaj and Ahmetović
Vučetaj and Vučetović
Čeljaj and Čelić
Brunçaj, Bruçaj 
 Kukaj
 Dedushaj
 Qosaj, Ćosović
 Selimaj
 Hakaj, Hakanjin

During SFR Yugoslavia, families had Serbian(ized) surnames.

Demographics
There is a high demographic vitality in Vusanje in relation to the other villages in the municipality. The village is inhabited exclusively by Albanians, Muslims by religion (2011 census).

Notable people
Sadri Ahmeti, painter
Mimoza Ahmeti, poet
Isa Qosja, Albanian film director
Rexhep Qosja (born 1936), Albanian writer and literary critic
Ahmet Zenel Gjonbalaj, rebel
Sadri Gjonbalaj, retired Albanian-American soccer player
Qerim Sadiku (1919-1946) Catholic saint

References

Sources

Populated places in Gusinje Municipality
Albanian communities in Montenegro
Islam in Montenegro